Potassium ascorbate is a compound with formula KC6H7O6. It is the potassium salt of ascorbic acid (vitamin C) and a mineral ascorbate.  As a food additive, it has E number E303, INS number 303. Although it is not a permitted food additive in the UK, USA and the EU, it is approved for use in Australia and New Zealand. According to some studies, it has shown a strong antioxidant activity and antitumoral properties.

References 

Ascorbates
Potassium compounds
Food additives
E-number additives